The 2011 Open Barletta Trofeo Dimiccoli & Boraccino was a professional tennis tournament played on clay courts. It was the 15th edition of the tournament which was part of the 2011 ATP Challenger Tour. It took place in Barletta, Italy between 28 March – 3 April 2011.

ATP entrants

Seeds

 Rankings are as of March 21, 2011.

Other entrants
The following players received wildcards into the singles main draw:
  Aljaž Bedene
  Fabio Fognini
  Thomas Muster
  Matteo Trevisan

The following players received entry from the qualifying draw:
  Andrea Arnaboldi
  Alberto Brizzi
  Pierre-Hugues Herbert
  Adelchi Virgili

Champions

Singles

 Aljaž Bedene def.  Filippo Volandri, 7–5, 6–3

Doubles

 Lukáš Rosol /  Igor Zelenay def.  Martin Fischer /  Andreas Haider-Maurer, 6–3, 6–2

External links
Official Website
ITF Search 
ATP official site

Open Barletta Trofeo Dimiccoli and Boraccino
Clay court tennis tournaments
Open Città della Disfida